Connie Johnson may refer to:

Connie Johnson (baseball) (1922–2004), American baseball player
Connie Johnson (fundraiser) (1977–2017), Australian cancer research fundraiser
Connie L. Johnson (born 1969), member of the Missouri House of Representatives
Constance N. Johnson (born 1952), American politician